James Lennox Kerr (1 July 1899 – 11 March 1963) was a Scottish socialist author noted for his children's stories written under the pseudonym of Peter Dawlish. 

Kerr lived in Paisley until 1915, joined the Royal Navy Volunteer Reserve by claiming to be 18, then served on merchant ships until 1929. After spending some time in Australia and America he settled in Pimlico in 1930, marrying Elizabeth "Mornie" Birch of Penwith, Cornwall in 1932. She was the daughter of Samuel John "Lamorna" Birch the RA painter. 

His first book, for adults, Back Door Guest, described life as a hobo in USA and Canada, and is full of social comment which was then controversial.  He wrote 32 books for children, most with a nautical theme and 23 books for adults, many commenting on working class life in Scotland, America and Australia. As an author he used, in addition to his own name, the pseudonyms "Gavin Douglas" for adult books and "Peter Dawlish" for children's books after 1938.   

Kerr served in World War I, on minesweepers in World War II, assisted at Omaha beach, and was mentioned in despatches.   

Kerr was a self-proclaimed socialist, but he was never a member of the Communist Party. He joined and then left the Labour Party. W. H. Marwick, in his bibliography on Scottish economic history, comments on the role of Kerr in representing proletariat labourers in his novels. Kerr was survived by a son, Adam Kerr, whose reminiscences of his father were used in works by authors Austin Wormleighton and Stephen Bigger.

Bibliography

As James Lennox Kerr
1930:Back Door Guest 
1930:Ice
1932:Glenshiels 
1935:Woman of Glenshiels (This novel is particularly noted for his portrayal of a conscientious objector in the First World War who is pressured to enlist in the British Army and is killed in France.)
1935:The Blackspit Smugglers (An adventure novel for boys) 
1936:The Eye of the Earth (A story of the arctic for boys) 
1940:The Eager Years: An Autobiography 
1950:Wavy Navy: by some who served (about the Royal Navy Volunteer Reserve.  It was edited by Kerr and David James, and includes a foreword by Lord Cunningham of Hyndhope.)
1953:Touching the Adventures - Of Merchantmen in the Second World War (edited by Kerr.  It featured a foreword by John Masefield. Kerr uses all three of his pen names in this volume.}
1954:The Great Storm: being the authentic story of the loss at sea of the Princess Victoria and other vessels early in 1953 
1957:The R.N.V.R.: A Record of Achievement (Another book about the Royal Navy Volunteer Reserve.  This time it was written by Kerr and Wilfred Granville, with a foreword by G. Thistleton-Smith.)
1959:Wilfred Grenfell, His Life and Work (A biography of Sir Wilfred Grenfell)

As Peter Dawlish
1939:Captain Peg-Leg's War (These were Kerr’s first children’s books as Peter Dawlish, for Oxford University Press.)
1939:Peg Leg and the Fur Pirates 
1940:Peg-Leg Sweeps the Sea 
1940:Peg-Leg and the Invaders 
1947:The First Tripper (A lad goes to sea on his first trip.)
The “Dauntless” Series describes the adventures of a group of five Cornish boys who restore a fishing boat, formerly a French crabber, with the help of Captain Blake.  These adventures were published between 1947 and 1960. Books in the series include:
	
1947:Dauntless Finds Her Crew 
1948:Dauntless Sails Again 
1949:Dauntless and the Mary Baines 
1950:Dauntless Takes Recruits 
1952:Dauntless Sails In 
1954:Dauntless in Danger 
1957:Sailors All! 
1960:Dauntless Goes Home 

Other children’s books using the Peter Dawlish pseudonym include:

1953:The Bagodia Episode (An adventure story set in Australia)
1954:Young Drake of Devon 
1955:He Went with Drake 
1955:Way for a Sailor 
1956:North Sea Adventure 
1956:Martin Frobisher 
1958:Aztec Gold 
1959:The Race for Gowrie Bay (about sealing)
1962:The Boy Jacko 
1963:The Seas of Britain (non-fiction)
1963:The Royal Navy (non-fiction)
1960:Johnno, the Deep-Sea Diver, the Life Story of Diver Johnson as told to Peter Dawlish by John Johnstone.
1966:Merchant Navy (non-fiction)

He also wrote adult novels as Gavin Douglas.
 1935:Rough Passage (London:Collins) The Tall Man (New York: G P Putnam's Sons, 1936)
 1936:The Obstinate Captain Samson (London:Collins/New York: G P Putnam's Sons, 1937)
 1937:Captain Samson, A.B. (London:Collins)
 1938:The Search for the Blue Sedan (London:Collins)
 1948:A Tale of Pimlico (London:Robert Hale) 
 1949:The Scuffler (London:Robert Hale) 
 1949:Seamanship for Passengers (London: John Lehman)
 1951:The Struggle'' (London:Robert Hale)

References

External links
 

1899 births
1963 deaths
British sailors